Quevedo Canton is a canton of Ecuador, located in the Los Ríos Province.  Its capital is the town of Quevedo.  Its population at the 2001 census was 139,790.

Demographics
Ethnic groups as of the Ecuadorian census of 2010:
Mestizo  66.2%
Montubio  16.7%
White  8.5%
Afro-Ecuadorian  7.5%
Indigenous  0.8%
Other  0.4%

References

Cantons of Los Ríos Province